Bungaree was a ship of Lund's Blue Anchor Line,  which operated between the United Kingdom and Australia between 1889 and 1903, when it was sold.

References 

1889 ships